Duret is a French surname. Notable people with the surname include:

Claude Duret, (c. 1570–1611), French judge, botanist, historiographer and linguist
Francisque Joseph Duret, (1804–1865), French sculptor
François Duret, (born 1911), Swiss fencer
François-Joseph Duret, (1732–1816), French sculptor
Henri Duret, (1849–1921), French neurologist
Théodore Duret, (1838–1927), French journalist, author and art critic

See also
Duret (grape), another name for the French wine grape Dureza
Peloursin, another French wine grape that is also known as Duret
Durrette, disambiguation

French-language surnames